St Joseph's GAA may refer to:

St Joseph's GAA (Laois), a sports club in Ballyadams–Luggacurren–The Swan–Wolfhill, Ireland
St Joseph's GAA (Louth), a sports club in Ireland
St Joseph's Doora-Barefield GAA, a sports club outside Ennis, Ireland
St Joseph's/OCB GAA, a sports club in Dublin's North Inner City, Ireland

See also
Ederney St Joseph's GAC, a sports club
Glenelly St Joseph's GAC, a sports club
Milltown Malbay GAA, a sports club occasionally referred to as St Joseph's
St Joseph's GFC (Donegal), a defunct sports club based in Bundoran–Ballyshannon, Ireland
St Joseph's Hurling Club, a sports club